The Vietnamese National U19 Football Championship is the national championship of association football for male players under the age of 19 organized by the Vietnam Football Federation (VFF).

Results

Top-performing clubs

Awards

References

External links
VPF
Giải bóng đá QG U17

Football leagues in Vietnam
Youth football in Vietnam